The 2012–13 Saint Mary's Gaels women's basketball team represented Saint Mary's College of California in the 2012–13 college basketball season. It was head coach Paul Thomas's seventh season at Saint Mary's. The Gaels, members of the West Coast Conference, played their home games at the McKeon Pavilion. They finished the season at 23–11, 11–5 in conference play, and clinched the #3 seed in the WCC Tourney. After losing in the semifinals of the WCC Tournament, Saint Mary's was invited to participate in the 2013 Women's National Invitation Tournament, where they advanced to the quarterfinal round before being eliminated.

Before the season
The Gaels were picked to finish third in the WCC behind BYU and Gonzaga. While the Gaels finished tied for third with BYU, the Treros were a sneaky bunch and claimed the #2 seed in the WCC.

Roster

Schedule and results

|-
!colspan=12 style="background:#06315B; color:#D80024;"| Regular Season

|-
!colspan=12 style="background:#D80024; color:#06315B;"| 2013 West Coast Conference women's basketball tournament

|-
!colspan=12 style="background:#D80024; color:#06315B;"| 2013 Women's National Invitation Tournament

Rankings

See also
Saint Mary's Gaels women's basketball

References

Saint Mary's Gaels women's basketball seasons
Saint Mary's
Saint Mary's
Saint
Saint